Peril at End House is a work of detective fiction by British writer  Agatha Christie, first published in the US by the Dodd, Mead and Company in February 1932 and in the UK by the Collins Crime Club in March of the same year. The US edition retailed at $2.00 and the UK edition at seven shillings and sixpence (7/6).

The book features Christie's private detective Hercule Poirot, as well as Arthur Hastings and Chief Inspector Japp, and is the sixth novel featuring Poirot. Poirot and Hastings vacation in Cornwall, meeting young Magdala "Nick" Buckley and her friends. He is persuaded that someone is out to kill her. They meet all of her friends at her home called End House. Though he aims to protect Nick, a murder happens that provokes Poirot to mount a serious investigation.

The novel was well received when first published, with the plot remarked as unusually ingenious and diabolically clever by reviewers. Writing in 1990, Robert Barnard found it cunning, but not one of Christie's very best. It has been adapted to stage, radio, film, television, graphic novel, and a computer game, and translated to many other languages as a book.

Plot summary
Poirot and Hastings are staying at a Cornish resort. Conversing with Magdala "Nick" Buckley, Poirot believes that someone is out to kill her, confirmed when he finds a bullet that Nick had thought to be a wasp shooting past her head. Poirot explains his concern to Nick. Poirot suspects someone in Nick's inner circle. Nick's nearest living relative is a lawyer cousin, Charles Vyse, who arranged the re-mortgaging on End House for her to supply desperately needed funds. Her housekeeper is Ellen, and the lodge near End House is leased by Australians Mr and Mrs Croft. George Challenger has a soft spot for Nick. Nick's two closest friends are Freddie Rice, an abused wife, and Jim Lazarus, an art dealer in love with Freddie. When Nick had surgery six months earlier, the Crofts suggested she make a will.

It is not clear who wants Nick dead. Charles would inherit End House and Freddie would get the rest of the estate – none of which is worth killing for. At Poirot's advice, Nick calls her cousin Maggie to stay with her for a few weeks. When Maggie arrives, Nick hosts a party with everyone present but George. A renowned pilot named Michael Seton has gone missing, sparking debate about his fate. Nick receives a call while the guests are enjoying the party. Maggie is found dead, wearing Nick's shawl. Nick and Maggie had gone to freshen up, after which Maggie wore Nick's shawl. George is relieved to see Nick alive. Realizing that Maggie was killed by mistake under his nose, Poirot becomes furious, launching an investigation.

To protect Nick, Poirot tells everyone that she is going to a hospital. He asks her not to eat anything from an unknown source. The next day, the newspapers report that Michael Seton is dead and Poirot correctly deduces that Nick received that information through the call. Nick confesses to Poirot that she and Michael were secretly engaged. Michael was the sole heir of vast wealth, and that wealth will go to his fiancée. Poirot is wary of the Crofts: he asks Inspector Japp to inquire about them. Poirot and Hastings find the love letters written by Michael, but do not find Nick's original will. Nick recalls sending it to Charles, who denies receiving it. Mr Croft tells Poirot that he sent the will to Charles; one of the men is lying. Nick receives a box of chocolates laced with cocaine, allegedly sent by Poirot. Nick is safe as she ate only one. The chocolates were delivered by Freddie, who claims that Nick phoned her to bring them. Poirot suspects Freddie, who is a cocaine addict.

Poirot sets up a ruse with Nick's participation, telling the others that Nick is dead. Charles tells Poirot that he received Nick's will, which is read in End House, awarding her money to the Crofts for helping her father in Australia. This startles all except the Crofts. Poirot announces to the stunned guests that a seance will be conducted and Nick's "ghost" appears, exposing the Crofts. They replaced her will with a forged one and sent it to Charles after they heard news of her death. Japp reveals that the Crofts are known forgers. He arrests the duo. But Poirot announces that they had no hand in the murder. Just then, someone outside shoots at Freddie and misses, then shoots himself. Poirot captures the man, Freddie's sick and dying husband, who wrote many notes begging her for money.

Poirot reveals that the real murderer is Nick. Michael was engaged to Maggie, not Nick: the cousins have the same name, Magdala Buckley. After learning of Michael's wealth and disappearance, Nick plotted to present herself as Michael's fiancée to usurp his wealth, a plot which required Maggie's death. The attempts on her life were her own work. George used to supply cocaine to both Freddie and Nick concealed in wristwatches; Nick used her supply to poison the chocolates. Nick is arrested, taking Freddie's wristwatch as a "souvenir"; the full box contains enough for Nick to take an overdose and escape the gallows. Poirot tells George either to surrender himself or go away, allowing Freddie to recover from her addiction. In the end, Jim and Freddie decide to marry, and Jim, who is an art dealer, reveals to Poirot that one of Nick's paintings on the wall is actually of considerable value,  though Nick herself did not realize it.

Literary significance and reception
The Times Literary Supplement on 14 April 1932, stated that the "actual solution is quite unusually ingenious, and well up to the standard of Mrs. Christie's best stories. Everything is perfectly fair, and it is possible to guess the solution of the puzzle fairly early in the book, though it is certainly not easy." The review further opined that, "This is certainly one of those detective stories which is pure puzzle, without any ornament or irrelevant interest in character. Poirot and his faithful Captain Hastings are characters whom one is glad to meet again, and they are the most lively in the book, but even they are little more than pawns in this problem. But the plot is arranged with almost mathematical neatness, and that is all that one wants."

Isaac Anderson began his review in The New York Times Book Review on 6 March 1932, by writing "With Agatha Christie as the author and Hercule Poirot as the central figure, one is always assured of an entertaining story with a real mystery to it ... [T]he person who is responsible for the dirty work at End House is diabolically clever, but not quite clever enough to fool the little Belgian detective all the time. A good story with a most surprising finish."

Robert Barnard: "A cunning use of simple tricks used over and over in Christie's career (be careful, for example, about names – diminutives and ambiguous male-female Christian names are always possibilities as readers discover). Some creaking in the machinery, and rather a lot of melodrama and improbabilities, prevent this from being one of the very best of the classic specimens."

References to other works
 Two references (in chapters 1 and 5) are made to the events told in The Mystery of the Blue Train and it is clearly stated in chapter 1 that Peril at End House takes place the August following Poirot's trip to the French Riviera described in that book.
 In chapter 9, there is an remark in passing, on the cleverest type of crime, which later became the theme of Curtain: Poirot's Last Case, which ends with his death.
 At the beginning of chapter 14, Hastings describes how Poirot's obsession for tidiness helped him solve a case when he straightened ornaments on a mantelpiece. This is an indirect reference to The Mysterious Affair at Styles.
 In chapter 15, Poirot mentions the case The Chocolate Box included in the book Poirot's Early Cases, when he tells Commander Challenger that he indeed had failures in the past.
 In chapter 16, Inspector Japp asks Poirot if he had not retired to grow marrows. This is an indirect reference to the failed attempt at retirement depicted in The Murder of Roger Ackroyd, when Poirot settled in the small village of King's Abbot, only to be prompted to investigate a murder in the village.

Allusions to actual history, geography and current science
Transposed from Devon to Cornwall, the Majestic Hotel of the book is based on the Imperial Hotel in Torquay.
In chapter seven, reference is made by the characters to a female aviator who went to Australia. This is an allusion to Amy Johnson who made the first solo flight from England to Australia by a woman from 5 May 1930 to 24 May 1930.
The attempt by Michael Seton to fly solo around the world is a key element in the novel, which was released in 1932.  At the time, the feat had never been achieved; in 1933, Wiley Post became the first aviator to circumnavigate the globe.

Publication history

 1932, Dodd Mead and Company (New York), February 1932, Hardcover, 270 pp
 1932, Collins Crime Club (London), March 1932, Hardcover, 256 pp
 1938, Modern Age Books (New York), Hardcover, 177 pp
 1942, Pocket Books (New York), Paperback, (Pocket number 167), 240 pp
 1948, Penguin Books, Paperback, (Penguin number 688), 204 pp
 1961, Fontana Books (Imprint of HarperCollins), Paperback, 191 pp
 1966, Pan books X521, Paperback
 1978, Ulverscroft Large-print Edition, Hardcover, 327 pp, 
 2007, Facsimile edition (Facsimile of 1932 UK first edition), 2 April 2007, Hardcover, 256 pp 

The first true publication of the book was the US serialisation in the weekly Liberty magazine in eleven instalments from 13 June (Volume 8, Number 24) to 22 August 1931, (Volume 8, Number 34). There were slight abridgements to the text, no chapter divisions, and the reference in Chapter III to the character of Jim Lazarus as, "a Jew, of course, but a frightfully decent one" was deleted. The serialisation carried illustrations by W.D. Stevens. In the UK, the novel was serialised in the weekly Women's Pictorial magazine in eleven instalments from 10 October (Volume 22, Number 561) to 19 December 1931, (Volume 22, Number 571) under the slightly different title of The Peril at End House. There were slight abridgements and no chapter divisions. All of the instalments carried illustrations by Fred W. Purvis.

Book dedication
The dedication of the book reads:
To Eden Phillpotts. To whom I shall always be grateful for his friendship and the encouragement he gave me many years ago.

In 1908, Christie was recovering from influenza and bored, and she started to write a story at the suggestion of her mother, Clara Miller (see the dedication to The Mysterious Affair at Styles). This suggestion sparked Christie's interest in writing and several pieces were composed, some of which are now lost or remain unpublished (one exception to this is The Call of Wings which later appeared in The Hound of Death in 1933). These early efforts were mostly short stories, but at some point late in the year Christie attempted her first novel, Snow Upon the Desert. She sent it to several publishers but they all rejected the work. At Clara's suggestion she then asked Phillpotts to read and critique both the book and other examples of her writing. He was a neighbour and friend of the Miller family in Torquay. He sent an undated reply back which included the praise that, "some of your work is capital. You have a great feeling for dialogue". In view of her later success in allowing readers to judge characters' feelings and motivations for themselves (and in doing so, thereby deceiving themselves as to the identity of the culprits), Phillpotts offered valuable suggestions to, "leave your characters alone, so that they can speak for themselves, instead of always rushing in to tell them what they ought to say, or to explain to the reader what they mean by what they are saying". He gave her further advice in the letter regarding a number of suggestions for further reading to help improve her work.

Phillpotts gave Christie an introduction to his own literary agents, Hughies Massie, who rejected her work (although in the early 1920s, they did start to represent her). Undaunted, Christie attempted another story, now lost, called Being So Very Wilful, and again asked Phillpotts for his views. He replied on 9 February 1909 with a great deal more advice and tips for reading. In her autobiography, published posthumously in 1977, Christie wrote, "I can hardly express the gratitude I feel to him. He could so easily have uttered a few careless words of well-justified criticism and possibly discouraged me for life. As it was, he set out to help".

Dustjacket blurb
The blurb on the inside flap of the dustjacket of the UK first edition (which is also repeated opposite the title page) reads:Three near escapes from death in three days! Is it accident or design? And then a fourth mysterious incident happens, leaving no doubt that some sinister hand is striking at Miss Buckley, the charming young owner of the mysterious End House. The fourth attempt, unfortunately for the would-be murderer, is made in the garden of a Cornish Riviera hotel where Hercule Poirot, the famous Belgian detective, is staying. Poirot immediately investigates the case and relentlessly unravels a murder mystery that must rank as one of the most brilliant that Agatha Christie has yet written.

Adaptations

Stage

The story was adapted into a play by Arnold Ridley in 1940 and opened in the West End of London at the Vaudeville Theatre on 1 May. Poirot was played by Francis L. Sullivan.

Television and film
A Soviet film version, entitled Zagadka Endkhauza, was made in 1989 by Vadim Derbenyov.

The novel was adapted for television in 1990, as part of the Agatha Christie's Poirot second series; it was the first full-length novel to be adapted. Poirot was portrayed by David Suchet and Nick Buckley by Polly Walker. Overall, the film was faithful to the novel; however, Freddie's husband does not appear in the film nor does he shoot at Nick during the denouement, Challenger is arrested rather than being allowed to flee, and the fates of Freddie and Jim remain unresolved.
Colonel Weston had been omitted from the adaptation and Miss Lemon added. This episode was filmed in Salcombe, Devon near Agatha Christie's home town of Torquay, rather than on the Cornish Coast where the story is set. 

The novel was adapted as an episode of the Japanese animated series Agatha Christie's Great Detectives Poirot and Marple, under the title "The Mystery of End House". It aired in 2004.

The novel was again adapted as the fourth episode of the first season of the French television series Les Petits Meurtres d'Agatha Christie, airing in 2009.

Radio
Peril at End House was adapted for radio by Michael Bakewell for BBC Radio 4 featuring John Moffatt as Poirot and Simon Williams as Captain Hastings.

Computer game
On 22 November 2007, Peril at End House, like Death on the Nile, was adapted into a PC game by Floodlight Games, and published as a joint venture between Oberon Games and Big Fish Games, with the player once again taking the role of Poirot as he searches End House and other areas in Cornwall Coast for clues, and questions suspects based on information he finds, this time through the clue cards he gains on the way. Two other titles developed by Floodlight Games were later released based on Christie's Dead Man's Folly and 4.50 from Paddington respectively.

Graphic novel
Peril at End House was released by HarperCollins as a graphic novel adaptation in 2008, adapted by Thierry Jollet and illustrated by Didier Quella-Guyot.

References

External links
Peril at End House at the official Agatha Christie website
 
 Agatha Christie: Peril at End House computer game

1932 British novels
Hercule Poirot novels
Works originally published in Liberty (general interest magazine)
Novels first published in serial form
Novels set in Cornwall
Dodd, Mead & Co. books
British novels adapted into films
British novels adapted into television shows
Collins Crime Club books